Maria Alexandrovna Lipman (born 1952) is a Russian journalist, political scientist and US—Russia policy expert, who edited the magazine of the Carnegie Moscow Center until 2014, and who writes for Foreign Affairs and other publications, and who is critical of Putin. She is an expert at the Institute of European, Russian and Eurasian Studies at George Washington University.

Early life and career 
Lipman was born on 25 October 1952 in Moscow. From 1991 to 1995, she worked as a translator, researcher and contributor for The Washington Post. Since 2001 she has had a monthly op-ed in The Post. From 1995 to 2001, she was deputy editor-in-chief of the  magazine.

She speaks English and Russian.

Views 
Writing in Foreign Affairs claims, "The crackdown that followed Putin's return to the Kremlin in 2012 extended to the liberal media, which had until then been allowed to operate fairly independently."

Published works
 
 .  See also: Tony Wood (historian)

References

Living people
Russian women journalists
Russian political scientists
1952 births
The Washington Post people